The Man from Hard Pan is a 1927 American silent Western film directed by Leo D. Maloney and starring Maloney, Eugenia Gilbert and Rosa Gore.

Cast
 Leo D. Maloney as Robert Alan 
 Eugenia Gilbert as Elizabeth Warner 
 Rosa Gore as Sarah Lackey 
 Murdock MacQuarrie as Henry Hardy 
 Paul Hurst as Larry Lackey 
 Ben Corbett as Jack Burton 
 Al Hart as Sheriff

References

External links
 

1927 films
1927 Western (genre) films
American black-and-white films
Pathé Exchange films
Films directed by Leo D. Maloney
Silent American Western (genre) films
1920s English-language films
1920s American films